V-set and immunoglobulin domain containing 1 is a protein that in humans is encoded by the VSIG1 gene.

Function
This gene encodes a member of the junctional adhesion molecule (JAM) family. The encoded protein contains multiple glycosylation sites at the N-terminal region, and multiple phosphorylation sites and glutamic acid/proline (EP) repeats at the C-terminal region. The gene is expressed in a normal stomach and testis, as well as in gastric, esophageal, and ovarian cancers. Alternatively spliced transcript variants, encoding different isoforms, have been found for this gene. [provided by RefSeq, Dec 2009].

References

Further reading